Le Teilleul is a commune in the Manche department in Normandy in north-western France. On 1 January 2016, the former communes of Ferrières, Heussé, Husson and Sainte-Marie-du-Bois were merged into Le Teilleul.

Heraldry

See also
Communes of the Manche department

References 

Teilleul